Sec1 family domain-containing protein 1 is a protein that in humans is encoded by the SCFD1 gene.

Interactions 

SCFD1 has been shown to interact with USO1.

References

Further reading